Hylomyrma is a genus of ants within the subfamily Myrmicinae. To date it contains 30 known species.

Species

Hylomyrma adelae Ulysséa, 2021
Hylomyrma balzani (Emery, 1894)
Hylomyrma blandiens Kempf, 1961
Hylomyrma columbica (Forel, 1912)
Hylomyrma dandarae Ulysséa, 2021
Hylomyrma dentiloba (Santschi, 1931)
Hylomyrma dolichops Kempf, 1973
Hylomyrma immanis Kempf, 1973
Hylomyrma jeronimae Ulysséa, 2021
Hylomyrma lispectorae Ulysséa, 2021
Hylomyrma longiscapa Kempf, 1961
Hylomyrma lopesi Ulysséa, 2021
Hylomyrma macielae Ulysséa, 2021
Hylomyrma margaridae Ulysséa, 2021
Hylomyrma mariae Ulysséa, 2021
Hylomyrma marielleae Ulysséa, 2021
Hylomyrma mitiae Ulysséa, 2021
Hylomyrma montana Pierce et al., 2017
Hylomyrma peetersi Ulysséa, 2021
Hylomyrma plumosa Pierce et al., 2017
Hylomyrma praepotens Kempf, 1973
Hylomyrma primavesi Ulysséa, 2021
Hylomyrma reginae Kutter, 1977
Hylomyrma reitteri (Mayr, 1887)
Hylomyrma sagax Kempf, 1973
Hylomyrma transversa Kempf, 1973
Hylomyrma versuta Kempf, 1973
Hylomyrma villemantae Neves & Lacau, 2018
Hylomyrma virginiae Ulysséa, 2021
Hylomyrma wachiperi Ulysséa, 2021

References

External links

Myrmicinae
Ant genera